is one of the three train services running on the Tōkaidō and San'yō Shinkansen lines.
Stopping at every station, the Kodama is the slowest Shinkansen service for trips between major cities such as Tokyo and Osaka. The Kodama trains are used primarily for travel to and from smaller cities such as Atami. Travelers between major cities generally take the Nozomi or Hikari services, which make fewer stops.

Shinkansen Kodama 
Kodama trains generally run over shorter distances than Nozomi and Hikari trains. Typical Kodama runs include Tokyo - Nagoya / Shin-Osaka, Tokyo - Mishima / Shizuoka / Hamamatsu, Mishima / Shizuoka / Nagoya - Shin-Osaka, and Shin-Osaka / Okayama / Hiroshima - Hakata as well as some shorter late-night runs.

The trainsets used for Kodama service are the same 700 series, and N700 series trains used for the Hikari and Nozomi services. Older 100 series and 300 series trains were also used for Kodama services on the Sanyō Shinkansen until they were withdrawn in 2012. In December 2008, reconfigured 500 series trains entered Kodama service to replace the withdrawn Sanyō Shinkansen 0 series trains. Many Sanyō Shinkansen Kodama services continue to and from Hakata-Minami on the Hakata-Minami Line.

Most Kodama trains have both reserved and non-reserved cars; however, some morning Kodama trains to Tokyo and evening trains departing Tokyo have non-reserved cars only to accommodate commuters living in Kanagawa and Shizuoka.

The newest shinkansen trainset, the N700, is currently used on some early morning and late night Kodama runs between Kokura and Hakata stations in Kyushu. All standard-class cars are non-reserved, and, as with all other N700 services, there is no smoking on these trains except in designated on-board smoking rooms.

At most intermediate stations, Kodama trains wait for faster trains, such as the Nozomi, Hikari, Sakura, and Mizuho, to pass through before resuming their journeys.

Rolling stock
 500 series 8-car V sets
 700-7000 series 8-car E sets
 N700A series 16-car X/K sets, modified from Z/N sets
 N700 series 8-car S/R

Former rolling stock
 0 series
 100 series
 300 series
 700-0 series
 700-3000 series

Pre-shinkansen
 151 series

Formations

N700 series (16 cars)
(All cars are no smoking except for smoking compartments located in cars 3, 7, 10, and 15.)

700 series (16 cars)

500 series (eight cars)
(All cars are no smoking except for smoking compartments in cars 3 and 7.)

N700 series (eight cars)
(All cars are no smoking except for smoking compartments in cars 3 and 7.)

700 series (eight cars)
(All cars are non-smoking.)

G: Green car (first class) (reserved seating)
R: Standard class reserved seating
C: Standard class reserved seating + compartments 
NR: Standard class non-reserved seating
NS: Non-smoking seats
S: Smoking seats

History

Limited express Kodama

Kodama debuted as a limited express service on the Tokaido Main Line on 1 November 1958. Services used 151 series trainsets. This was the first EMU train service of the Japanese National Railways classified as a limited express, the highest (fastest) of train types on the national railway system. The train travelled between Tokyo Station and Osaka Station in six hours and 50 minutes and first enabled passengers to go and return between the two cities in one day. This is why the train was named Kodama, or echo.

A narrow gauge world speed record of 163 km/h was established by a 151 series Kodama trainset on 31 July 1959. The conventional Kodama train ran until 30 September 1964, the day before Kodama debuted on the Shinkansen.

Shinkansen Kodama
The shinkansen Kodama services began on 1 October 1964, operating between Tokyo and Shin-Osaka.

On 17 March 2012, the remaining 100 series (K) sets were withdrawn from Kodama services and 700 series (8-car E set) Kodama services became entirely no-smoking. Onboard trolley refreshment services were discontinued on all JR Central Kodama services from 17 March 2012. Also, some of the 16-car 500 series that used to run as the Nozomi service were cut short to eight cars to run as the Kodama service.

See also
 List of named passenger trains of Japan

References

Central Japan Railway Company
West Japan Railway Company
Railway services introduced in 1958
Named Shinkansen trains